Esmond is a city in Benson County, North Dakota, United States. The population was 91 at the 2020 census. Esmond was founded in 1901.

Geography
Esmond is located at  (48.034124, -99.764224).

Demographics

2010 census
As of the census of 2010, there were 100 people, 58 households, and 26 families living in the city. The racial makeup of the city was 99.0% White and 1.0% Native American.

There were 58 households, of which 12.1% had children under the age of 18 living with them, 36.2% were married couples living together, 3.4% had a female householder with no husband present, 5.2% had a male householder with no wife present, and 55.2% were non-families. 50.0% of all households were made up of individuals, and 32.7% had someone living alone who was 65 years of age or older. The average household size was 1.72 and the average family size was 2.46.

The median age in the city was 52.6 years. 13% of residents were under the age of 18; 4% were between the ages of 18 and 24; 18% were from 25 to 44; 25% were from 45 to 64; and 40% were 65 years of age or older. The gender makeup of the city was 50.0% male and 50.0% female.

2000 census
As of the census of 2000, there were 159 people, 78 households, and 42 families living in the city. The population density was 352.8 people per square mile (136.4/km2). There were 114 housing units at an average density of 253.0 per square mile (97.8/km2). The racial makeup of the city was 94.97% White, 3.14% Native American, 0.63% from other races, and 1.26% from two or more races. Hispanic or Latino of any race were 1.89% of the population.

There were 78 households, out of which 14.1% had children under the age of 18 living with them, 52.6% were married couples living together, and 44.9% were non-families. 41.0% of all households were made up of individuals, and 26.9% had someone living alone who was 65 years of age or older. The average household size was 2.04 and the average family size was 2.70.

In the city, the population was spread out, with 18.9% under the age of 18, 1.9% from 18 to 24, 22.0% from 25 to 44, 18.2% from 45 to 64, and 39.0% who were 65 years of age or older. The median age was 54 years. For every 100 females, there were 96.3 males. For every 100 females age 18 and over, there were 95.5 males.

The median income for a household in the city was $33,281, and the median income for a family was $36,250. Males had a median income of $26,250 versus $16,250 for females. The per capita income for the city was $17,706. None of the families and 0.7% of the population were living below the poverty line, including no under eighteens and 2.4% of those over 64.

References

External links
 Esmond diamond jubilee, 1901-1976, Esmond, North Dakota from the Digital Horizons website

Cities in Benson County, North Dakota
Cities in North Dakota
Populated places established in 1901
1901 establishments in North Dakota